The 1914 Cork Senior Hurling Championship was the 27th staging of the Cork Senior Hurling Championship since its establishment by the Cork County Board in 1887.

Blackrock were the defending champions.

On 15 November 1914, Midleton won the championship following a walkover by Blackrock in the final. This was their first championship title.

Results

Final

Miscellaneous

 Midleton are awarded their first title.
 Midleton add a hurling title to their two football titles.

References

Cork Senior Hurling Championship
Cork Senior Hurling Championship